Otto Edelmann (5 February 1917 – 14 May 2003) was an Austrian operatic bass.

Life 
Edelmann was born in Vienna and studied singing with Gunnar Graarud. His debut was at Gera as Figaro in Mozart's The Marriage of Figaro. He later sang the Vienna State Opera, the Edinburgh International Festival and the Metropolitan Opera. He sang at the Bayreuth Festival immediately after its reopening in 1951 after World War II, performing the role of Hans Sachs in Wagner's Die Meistersinger von Nürnberg. (He also recorded as Veit Pogner the goldsmith in the same work in one of Hans Knappertsbusch's early recorded performances.) He also sang Ochs in Richard Strauss's Der Rosenkavalier at the first performances in the new Salzburg Festspielhaus in 1960. In 1957, he recorded the role of Wotan opposite Kirsten Flagstad in Georg Solti's recording of Act III of Wagner's Die Walküre (an album made prior to the later famous complete set of Der Ring des Nibelungen). In 1982, he received a professorship for vocal pedagogy at the Vienna Music Academy. He died in Vienna at the age of 86.

Personal life
He is the father of the Austrian baritones Peter Edelmann and Paul Armin Edelmann.

Voice
His powerful, dark voice has proven itself in Wagner roles as well as in tasks from the Buffo subject.

Recordings

CDs
Edelmann sang Ochs in Paul Czinner's classic recording of Der Rosenkavalier conducted by Herbert von Karajan with Elizabeth Schwarzkopf and Christa Ludwig.

Videos
Videos are available of him as Baron Ochs (with Elisabeth Schwarzkopf) and Leporello (with Cesare Siepi).

Awards
 1960 Kammersänger
 1971 Max Reinhardt Medal
 Honorary member of the Wiener Staatsoper
 1994 Lieber Augustin
 Golden Decoration of Honour for Services to the Republic of Austria

References

External links
Otto Edelmann Society
Leporello (YouTube)

Operatic bass-baritones
Musicians from Vienna
1917 births
2003 deaths
20th-century Austrian male opera singers
Österreichischer Kammersänger